Aliabad (also Romanized as ‘Alīābād) is a village in Rezqabad Rural District, in the Central District of Esfarayen County, North Khorasan Province, Iran. At the 2006 census, its population was 200, in 49 families.

References 

Populated places in Esfarayen County